Thallarcha levis is a moth in the subfamily Arctiinae. It was described by Turner in 1943. It is found in Australia, where it has been recorded from the Northern Territory and Queensland.

The wingspan is about 15 mm.

References

Moths described in 1943
Lithosiini